The Soil Dryness Index (SDI) uses daily rainfall and maximum temperature from local meteorological stations to estimate soil dryness across tens of kilometers. It estimates the millimeters of rain needed to fill the soil with water (Mount 1972, 1980). The term was coined by Mount to focus attention on how useful a reliable measure of soil dryness is for flood and fire forecasting and management. Tasmanian government departments, businesses and land managers have used the SDI for these purposes for over 50 years and it is published daily by the Tasmanian Fire Service. Other states in Australia also make use of the SDI.

The model uses a water budget approach and assumes relatively simple mechanisms for the wetting and drying stages (Figure 1, Figure 2)

For the wetting stage, the rain falling on water, such as rivers and lakes, and marsh soils bypasses normal forest soils and produces flash run-off (FR). Some other rain is intercepted by and dried from forest canopies (I). The amount of rainfall going to flash run-off and canopy interception are taken off the daily rain gauge reading (P), to estimate how much rain reaches and wets forest soils.  The model assumes each 150 mm of a typical meter-deep soil holds about 25 mm of rain. Run-off from full soils (SDI=0) is soil capacity overflow (SCO).

For the drying stage, both evaporation (E) from the soil and transpiration (T) through the plants are controlled by daily maximum temperature at five reducing rates (Keetch and Byram 1968; Mount 1972; Langford, Duncan and Heeps 1977; Burrows 1987).

Application of the Soil Dryness index 
The Tasmanian SDI has five soil drying stages that relate to forest dryness and flammability. The following are the SDI ranges used in Tasmania.

See also

 Palmer drought index
 Keetch–Byram drought index
Temperature Vegetation Water Stress Index (TVWSI)

References 

Bell FC and Gatenby MT (1969) Effects of exotic softwoods afforestation on water yield. Water Res. Fnd. Australia. Bull. 15,

Burrows ND (1987) The Soil Dryness Index for use in fire control in the south-west of Western Australia. Department of Conservation and Land Management. Technical Report No. 17, Perth.

Keetch JJ and Byram GM (1968) A drought index for forest fire control. USDA Forest Service Res. Paper Se-38. 32 pp. Retrieved August 11, 2016 from http://www.srs.fs.usda.gov/pubs/viewpub.jsp?index=40

Langford KJ, Duncan HP and Heeps DF (1977) Evaluation and use of a water balance model. Institution of Engineers, Australia, Hydrology Symposium.

Mount AB (1972) The derivation and testing of a Soil Dryness Index using run-off data. Forestry Commission Tasmania. Bull. 4. (Imperial units)

Mount AB (1980) Estimation of evaporative losses from forests; a proven, simple model with wide applications. Hydrology & Water Resources Symposium. Adelaide (Metric units)

Rutter AJ (1963) Studies in the water relationships of Pinus sylvestris in plantation conditions. I. Measurement of rainfall and interception. Jour. Ecol. 51.

Meteorological indices
Soil